"Who the Hell Is Edgar?" is a song by Austrian singers Teya and Salena, released on 8 March 2023. The song is set to represent Austria in the Eurovision Song Contest 2023 after it was internally selected by ORF, the Austrian broadcaster for the Eurovision Song Contest.

Eurovision Song Contest

Internal selection 
On 31 January 2023, ORF announced during the radio show , aired on Ö3, that they had internally selected Teya and Salena to represent Austria in the Eurovision Song Contest 2023 with a song written by the singers themselves at a songwriting camp in the Czech Republic.

On 7 March, both artists announced that the title of their entry was "Who the Hell Is Edgar?", a reference to American writer and literary critic Edgar Allan Poe.

At Eurovision 
According to Eurovision rules, all nations with the exceptions of the host country and the "Big Five" (France, Germany, Italy, Spain and the United Kingdom) are required to qualify from one of two semi-finals in order to compete for the final; the top ten countries from each semi-final progress to the final. The European Broadcasting Union (EBU) split up the competing countries into six different pots based on voting patterns from previous contests, with countries with favourable voting histories put into the same pot. On 31 January 2023, an allocation draw was held, which placed each country into one of the two semi-finals, and determined which half of the show they would perform in. Austria has been placed into the second semi-final, to be held on 11 May 2023, and has been scheduled to perform in the second half of the show.

References 

2023 singles
2023 songs
Cultural depictions of Edgar Allan Poe
Eurovision songs of 2023
Eurovision songs of Austria